The men's shot put at the 2022 World Athletics Championships was held at the Hayward Field in Eugene on 15 and 17 July 2022.

Summary
All the medalists returned from the previous World Championships, where all three were separated by a mere centimeter.  In fact, seven of the 12 finalists returned 3 years later.  

Fifth in the order, Olympic Champion Ryan Crouser was the first over 22 metres with a 22.21m.  Ninth, defending champion Joe Kovacs upped the ante with his 22.63m.  Indoor Champion Darlan Romani moved into third place with 21.69m, which held up until the next thrower, Josh Awotunde pushed Crouser into third place with a 22.24m.  Crouser answered in the second round with a 22.71m.  That held up until the fifth round.  First returning Bronze medalist  Tom Walsh threw 22.08 to become the fourth competitor over 22.  Awotunde responded with a personal best 22.29m.  Then Kovacs unleashed a 22.89, just 2 cm shy of his winning throw three years earlier to take the lead.  Seconds later, as the next thrower in the ring, Crouser answered with a Championship Record .  None of the leaders could improve in the sixth round leaving an American sweep on home soil.

Records
Before the competition records were as follows:

Qualification standard
The standard to qualify automatically for entry was 21.10 m.

Schedule
The event schedule, in local time (UTC−7), was as follows:

Results

Qualification 

Qualification: Qualifying Performance 21.20 (Q) or at least 12 best performers (q) advanced to the final.

Final 

The final was started on 17 July at 18:27.

References

Shot put
Shot put at the World Athletics Championships